Rahila bint Amur Al Riyami (died 5 February 2017) was an Omani politician. Along with Lujaina Mohsin Darwish, she was one of the first two Omani women to be directly elected to the Consultative Assembly in 2000.

Biography
Al Riyami was a civil servant, serving as Director of Educational Planning at the Ministry of Education for 16 years. In 2000 she was one of fifteen female candidates in the general elections that year. Running in Bawshar, she was one of two women elected. She was re-elected to the Assembly in 2003. In 2007 she was appointed to the Council of State, serving as its head of Human Resources Development. She died in 2017

References

Year of birth missing
2017 deaths
Omani civil servants
Members of the Consultative Assembly (Oman)
Members of the Council of State (Oman)
21st-century Omani women politicians
21st-century Omani politicians